Cypridinidae is a family of ostracods, containing the following genera:

Amphisiphonostra Poulsen, 1962
Azygocypridina Sylvester-Bradley, 1950
Bathyvargula Kornicker, 1968
Codonocera Brady, 1902
Cypridina Milne-Edwards, 1840
Cypridinodes Brady, 1902
Doloria Skogsberg, 1920
Enewton Cohen & Morin, 2010
Gigantocypris Skogsberg, 1920
Hadacypridina Poulsen, 1962
Isocypridina Kornicker, 1975
Jimmorinia Cohen & Kornicker in Cohen, Kornicker & Iliffe, 2000
Kornickeria Cohen & Morin, 1993
Lowrya Parker, 1998
Macrocypridina Skogsberg, 1920
Maristella  Reda et al., 2019
Melavargula Poulsen, 1962
Metavargula Kornicker, 1970
Monopia Poulsen, 1962
Paracypridina Poulsen, 1962
Paradoloria Poulsen, 1962
Paravargula Cohen & Kornicker, 1975
Photeros Cohen & Morin, 2010
Pseudodoloria Kornicker, 1994
Pterocypridina Poulsen, 1962
Rheina Kornicker, 1989
Rugosidoloria Kornicker, 1975
Sheina Harding, 1966
Siphonostra Skogsberg, 1920
Skogsbergia Kornicker, 1974
Vargula Skogsberg, 1920

References

External links
 
 

Myodocopida
Ostracod families